Chaoyang Road is a major east–west road in the east of the Beijing city.
The road is circa 17 km long, stretching from the East 3rd Ring Road into the Tongzhou District as an auxiliary road to the Jingtong Expressway.
It connects the Chaoyangmen Outer Street and the Jingha Expressway, crossing  East 4th Ring Road, East 5th Ring Road and the second expressway of Beijing Airport.
It also runs through Balizhuang, Guanzhuang and Shuangqiao regions. The CCTV Building, People's Daily headquarters, Communication University of China and Beijing International Studies University are alongside Chaoyang Road.

Chaoyang Road was historically a business street in Beijing. Due to transportation problems, it gradually lost the luster in modern times. 
Since the road conditions and related infrastructure have been improved in recent years, it starts to become once again attractive to investors.

References

Further reading
 
 
 
 

Road transport in Beijing
Chaoyang District, Beijing